Kamagambo Adventist College is a private Christian co-educational school owned and operated by the Seventh-day Adventist Church in  Kenya. The college is located in Kisii, Kenya.

It is a part of the Seventh-day Adventist education system.

History

Faculties

See also

 List of Seventh-day Adventist colleges and universities
 Seventh-day Adventist education
 Seventh-day Adventist Church
 Seventh-day Adventist theology
 History of the Seventh-day Adventist Church

References 

Universities and colleges in Kenya
Universities and colleges affiliated with the Seventh-day Adventist Church